Saint-André-de-Sangonis (Sant Andrieu de Sangònis in Occitan) is a commune in the Hérault department in the Occitanie region
in southern France.

Population

Sights
Jardin botanique de la Font de Bézombes

See also
Communes of the Hérault department

References

Communes of Hérault